S.N.A.P. (Chinese: 熠熠星光总动员, formally known as 全星总动员) is a Singaporean television talent competition to find the next star. After running for 3 seasons, the producers of the show decided to change show's Chinese title. Similar from previous seasons, contestants are scouted on the streets and shopping malls. The show hosts will be broken into 2 teams to choose their contestants and let the public vote to decide the winner of the different categories each week. This is the 4th installation from the previous seasons, last aired in 2004.

Hosts 
Lee Teng and Zhou Ying were confirmed to be joining the show as a new addition while the other team is made up of former season host Bryan Wong and Kym Ng.

Season 4 Contestants

Singaporean television series